HMS Ganges was a training ship and later stone frigate of the Royal Navy. She was established as a boys' training establishment in 1865, and was based aboard a number of hulks before moving ashore.  She was based alternately in Falmouth, Harwich (from 1899) and Shotley (from 1905).  She remained in service at RNTE Shotley until October 1976.

HMS Ganges was also known as Shotley Training Establishment.

Foundation and early history
The increasing professionalism of the Royal Navy and the reform of practices during the mid-nineteenth century led to the need to establish new training centres at which recruits could be inducted into navy life. The Admiralty decided to set aside five old laid up hulks in different ports around the country, and use them as bases at which volunteers aged between 15 and 17 could spend a year being educated for future service in the navy.  The plan called for an annual intake of 3,500 boys. They were to be trained in seamanship and gunnery, as well as traditional aspects of sea life. One of the hulks chosen to be converted into a school was the old 84-gun second-rate ship of the line . Despite initial objections that her layout made her unsuitable for the task, the decision went ahead.

She put into Devonport on 5 May 1865 and underwent a refit.  She took her first intake of 180 boys on 1 January 1866. They had been transferred from the training ship HMS Wellesley, then at Chatham. Wellesleys commander, Frederick H. Stevens also came with the boys and became Gangess commanding officer. Having been refitted to provide accommodation for 500 boys, Ganges was towed to Mylor by the paddle tug Gladiator. She arrived on 20 March 1866 and was anchored in the Carrick Roads.

Allegations of abuse

During Gangess time in Cornwall allegations of harsh and brutal treatment were reported to the Admiralty. One wardroom steward shot himself over the matter, and the reports aroused indignation in the local community. Captain Tremlett, the senior officer of training ships, was ordered to investigate the situation and reported that Commander Stevens "had given punishments which were not laid down in the Training Regulations and had also prevented his ship's company from taking due leave." Stevens and his first lieutenant were subsequently removed, and were replaced by Commander F. W. Wilson on 24 July 1866. By the end of 1866 there were 478 boys at the establishment.

Ganges was occasionally sailed to Devonport to undergo refits. The establishment had become an important part of local life, as in 1870 a rumour began to circulate that Ganges would not return after one such refit. The mayor was pressured to contact the local Member of Parliament, and also to ask questions of a Government minister. The rumour was then disproved. By 1899 the declining number of boys joining Ganges led the Admiralty to decide to move her to a more populated area. Petitions were organised by the local councils, but were unable to sway the Admiralty. Ganges sailed from Mylor on 27 August 1899. She was refitted in Devonport, which involved her keel being scraped. She spent two months here before being towed to Harwich by the tug Alligator. She arrived on 11 November 1899.  had arrived shortly before Ganges and served as a temporary hospital ship.

Ganges at Harwich
Ganges commenced her usual role at Harwich, with Caroline providing medical facilities whilst shore facilities were constructed in the town. Hospital facilities had been completed by 1902 and Caroline was refitted at Chatham to serve as an overflow training ship for Ganges, providing accommodation for another 60 boys. Despite these developments, it was decided to move Ganges again, this time to Shotley, in Suffolk. Work had already begun there on new Royal Naval Sick Quarters. Ganges left Harwich in 1903 for Shotley. £20,000 had been set aside to build shore-based accommodation, and a further £80,000 had been earmarked to cover the future expansion of the facility.

Ganges at Shotley
New building works began in February 1904, and the old  arrived. She had already spent time as a depot ship for various establishments. She had been named HMS Boscawen in March 1904 whilst at Portland and now arrived to provide further facilities for Ganges. The completion of shore works in 1905 led to the establishment of RNTE Shotley on 4 October. The facility included the buildings onshore and the ships offshore, which were HMS Ganges, HMS Caroline and HMS Boscawen II. The focus of the establishment now moved to shore based activities, and the capstan, bitts and figureheads were moved from the ships onto the shore.  In November the establishment received the ex , which had been renamed HMS Boscawen III.

1906 changes

1906 was a period of considerable changes for the establishment. On 21 June HMS Ganges was renamed HMS Tenedos III in preparation for her reassignment to become part of the Boy Artificers Establishment at Chatham. She left the establishment on 5 July. Also on 21 June HMS Boscawen (the old HMS Minotaur) was renamed HMS Ganges as her replacement. HMS Boscawen II (the former HMS Agincourt) was renamed HMS Ganges II.

Later developments
In 1907 the 143-foot (44 m)-high mast of the old steam corvette  was erected. It would become a major landmark. The old HMS Minotaur had been HMS Ganges since 1906, but was renamed HMS Ganges II on 25 April 1908. HMS Caroline was renamed HMS Ganges that month as her replacement. In 1909 the Signal School was established and three signal masts were erected. In 1910 the old HMS Agincourt had been removed to become a coal hulk, leaving only the old HMS Minotaur as Ganges II.  By 1912 Ganges II was being used as an overflow ship as the number of boys in the establishment increased, and she was duly moved closer inshore. A floating dock was also moored nearby for the use of destroyers and submarines. In September 1913 HMS Ganges (the former HMS Caroline) was renamed HMS Powerful III and left the establishment. HMS Ganges II (the former HMS Minotaur) was renamed HMS Ganges. She became the base ship of the establishment during the First World War. On 8 October 1913 HMS Ganges II became an independent command and was based at RNTE Shotley.

First World War
From 1914 to 1918, HMS Ganges was commanded by Commodore (later Rear-Admiral) G. C. Cayley. In 1916 the establishment was bombed by a German Zeppelin. Rationing measures nearly produced a mutiny in 1917 but dispersed peacefully. In 1918 the base suffered outbreaks of spanish flu and diphtheria. Armistice Day was celebrated by a display of mast manning.

Post war developments
By October 1919  briefly became the depot ship for the base. Also that year HMS Ganges, the former HMS Minotaur was renamed HMS Ganges II, and so joined RNTE Shotley in sharing the name. On 3 August 1921 the   became the establishment's tender. By now so many boys were attending the base that they had to be sent to training battleships to finish their training. HMS Ganges II (the old HMS Minotaur) was towed away in 1922 by the Dutch tug Swartezee and was broken up. Since only active ships bore names at this time, the name HMS Ganges temporarily ceased to exist, but the training establishment at RNTE Shotley continued. HMS Tring was paid off into reserve on 20 October 1925 as an economy measure.

It was decided by 1927 that RNTE Shotley would be renamed after the original training ship and she was recommissioned as HMS Ganges that year. In 1930 Edward, Prince of Wales visited the establishment.  A number of administrative reforms were also carried out this year, including the establishment of eight internal divisions named after famous admirals.

Ganges in the Second World War
The outbreak of the Second World War led to the decision to close HMS Ganges as a boys' training centre. HMS Ganges continued in service, being used as a centre for "Hostilities Only New Entry Training". A new overspill centre was commissioned at Highnam Court, near Gloucester on 28 April 1941, and it was defined as a tender to HMS Ganges. Another royal visit came on 12 October when Prince Henry, Duke of Gloucester inspected the establishment. Eventually by the end of the war 60,968 ratings had passed through Ganges.

Postwar and closure
Ganges reopened as a boys' training establishment in October 1945. The establishment soon regained its former size and importance, continuing to expand its facilities. A number of VIP visits took place, Prince Philip, Duke of Edinburgh visited in 1956, First Lord of the Admiralty Lord Carrington visited in 1960 and Queen Elizabeth II in 1961. In 1975 Ganges was opened to the public for the first time, with Admiral of the Fleet Louis Mountbatten, 1st Earl Mountbatten of Burma the guest of honour. It was decided by the Admiralty to close HMS Ganges, which was done on 6 June 1976.

Following closure of HMS Ganges the married quarter estate was used by Royal Air Force (RAF) personnel from nearby RAF facilities. In 1999 a large section of the former non-commissioned officer quarters were acquired by The Welbeck Estate Group.

References

 
 Warlow, Ben, Shore Establishments of the Royal Navy, Liskeard : Maritime, 2000. 
 The HMS Ganges association, including the history, and photographs
 Douglas, John, HMS GANGES – "Roll On My Dozen", 1978. 
 HMS GANGES Roll on my Dozen! Online eBook Version
 'HMS GANGES DAYS' by Peter Broadbent  Paperback.  eBook version available from publishers (www.chaplinbooks.co.uk)and Amazon.
 Douglas, John, HMS GANGES – "Tales of The Trogs", 1995.

External links

 GANGES Museum Houses memorabilia from the old shore establishment.
  The HMS Ganges Museum collection has been published online and includes thousands of historic photographs.
 HMS GANGES Books  Historical books and DVDs of HMS GANGES.
 HMS Ganges (Shotley)  photos taken between 2006 and 2009

 

Royal Navy bases in England
Royal Navy shore establishments
Training establishments of the Royal Navy
Military installations established in 1865
Military installations closed in 1976